CKOY may refer to:

 CKOY-FM in Sherbrooke, Quebec,
 a former call sign of CIWW in Ottawa, Ontario,
 a former call sign of CHYK-FM in Timmins, Ontario.